Xanməmmədli (also, Xaməmmədli and Khanmamedli) is a village and municipality in the Zardab Rayon of Azerbaijan.  It has a population of 465.

References 

Populated places in Zardab District